Mzuvukile Gift Sofisa (born  in Port Elizabeth) is a South African rugby union player for the  in the Currie Cup and the Rugby Challenge. His regular position is prop.

Career

Youth

Sofisa represented the Eastern Province Under-18 side at the 2011 Craven Week competition. He joined their academy and represented their Under-21 side in the 2012 and 2013 Under-21 Provincial Championship competitions, helping them to the Division B title in both those seasons.

Senior career

He was included in the  senior side for the 2014 Vodacom Cup competition and made his senior debut for them by starting in their 17–10 opening day defeat to Kenyan side .

References

South African rugby union players
Living people
1993 births
Rugby union players from Port Elizabeth
Eastern Province Elephants players
Rugby union props